Ann Eliza Smith (pen name, Mrs. J. Gregory Smith; October 7, 1819 – January 6, 1905) was an American author. She was president of the board of managers for the Vermont woman's exhibit at the Centennial Exposition of 1876, at Philadelphia, and was frequently chosen in similar capacities as a representative of Vermont women. During the Civil War, she coordinated a response to the Confederate raid on St. Albans on  October 19, 1864.  In 1870, Governor Peter T. Washburn, who had served as adjutant general of the Vermont Militia during the war, recognized her efforts and presented her with an honorary commission as a lieutenant colonel on his military staff.

Early life and education
Ann Eliza Brainerd was born in St. Albans, Vermont on October 7, 1819.  The daughter of Senator Lawrence Brainerd and Fidelia B. Gadcombe, she was raised and educated in St. Albans.

Career
In 1842, she married J. Gregory Smith, who served as Governor during the Civil War.  They were the parents of six children, including Edward Curtis Smith, who also served as governor.

Author

Smith wrote essays, poems and other works, and is best known for her three novels, Seola, Selma, and Atla.
Her first published work, From Dawn to Sunrise (1876) dealt with the historical and philosophical religious ideas of mankind.  Its success caused Henry K. Adams, author of A Centennial History of St. Albans Vermont to call it "[t]he smartest book ever written in Vermont." Her second work was Seola (1878), which was written as an antediluvian diary. The next novel published was Selma (1883), a Viking love story. The third novel, Atla (New York: Harper & Brothers, 1886), was about the sinking of the legendary lost island called Atlantis. At least one reviewer, The Churchman, was highly critical of it:—

In 1924, Seola was revised by the "Bible Students"—later known as Jehovah's Witnesses—and retitled Angels and Women. Smith usually wrote under her married name, Mrs. J. Gregory Smith, but both Seola and Angels and Women were published anonymously; they were later ascribed to her by the Library of Congress.

St. Albans Raid
On the afternoon of October 19, 1864, the northernmost land event of the Civil War occurred, the St. Albans Raid.  Confederates infiltrated the town, robbed several banks, wounded two citizens (one mortally), and fled north to Canada.  Since he was serving as governor, the home of J. Gregory Smith was a target of the raid.  Governor Smith was not at home, and when Mrs. Smith appeared in the front doorway carrying an unloaded pistol (the only weapon she could find), the raiders decided to bypass the house. She then worked to organize the people of St. Albans to mount a pursuit of the raiders, which unsuccessfully attempted to prevent them from escaping to Canada.

For her actions in defending the Smith home and efforts to rally the people of St. Albans in pursuing the raiders, Governor Washburn named Mrs. Smith a brevet lieutenant colonel on his staff.  Washburn, who served as governor from 1869 until his death in 1870, had served in the Union Army early in the Civil War, and then spent the rest of the conflict as Adjutant General of the Vermont Militia.  Under Washburn's direction, units of the militia had attempted to pursue the Confederate raiders, and later patrolled the border with Canada to ensure there were no further efforts to conduct Confederate activities in Vermont.

Smith wrote of her personal reminiscences of the St. Albans Raid in The Vermonter:—

Death and legacy
Smith died in St. Albans on January 6, 1905. She was buried in Greenwood Cemetery. The town of Brainerd, Minnesota was named in her honor.

Selected works
 Seola
 The iceberg's story, 1881
 Selma, 1883
 Notes of travel in Mexico and California , 1886
 Poems : "gather up the fragments", 1889
 Lines to a cricket, holograph poem found in the... by J Gregory Smith, Mrs., 1901
 Atla : a story of the lost island, 1886
 From dawn to sunrise : a review, historical and philosophical of the religious ideas of mankind, 1876
 Personal reminiscences of early life in Vermont : published in the St. Albans Daily Messenger, starting November 22, 1924 
 Angels and women

References

Attribution

Bibliography

External links
 
 "In Search of Mrs. J. G. Smith"
 Angels and Women
 Online text
 Official website

1819 births
1905 deaths
19th-century American novelists
19th-century American women writers
American fantasy writers
American women novelists
People from St. Albans, Vermont
Novelists from Vermont
People of Vermont in the American Civil War
Women science fiction and fantasy writers
First Ladies and Gentlemen of Vermont
Pseudonymous women writers
Union Army officers
19th-century pseudonymous writers